This is a list of films with live-action and animation, films that combine live action and animated elements, typically interacting.

Shorts by decade

1900s
 1900 – The Enchanted Drawing

1910s
 1914 – Gertie the Dinosaur
 1917 –  ("When Captain Grogg was to be painted")
 1918 – Out of the Inkwell series (animated characters in live action surroundings: series between 1918 and 1929)

1920s
 1923 – Alice Comedies series (live action girl in animated surroundings)
 1929 – Bosko, the Talk-Ink Kid

1930s
 1933 – Zero for Conduct
 1936 – Puppet Show
 1938 – Daffy Duck in Hollywood (live action film clips)

1940s
 1940 – You Ought to Be in Pictures
 1940 – Eatin' on the Cuff or The Moth Who Came to Dinner
 1943 – Who Killed Who? (two live-action sequences)
 1944 - What's Cookin' Doc?
 1949 – Señor Droopy
 1949 – The House of Tomorrow
 1949 – Rabbit Hood (footage from The Adventures of Robin Hood)

1950s
 1951 – Cold Turkey (live action wrestling match on TV)
 1953 – The Three Little Pups (cowboys riding horses; Southern Wolf riding on black-and-white live action horse)
 1959 – Donald in Mathmagic Land (live-action character at a billiards game, orchestra, paintings, human figures and live-action objects)
 1959 – The Mouse That Jack Built (live action sequence at the end)

1960s
 1961 – Donald and the Wheel (silhouettes of two actors, live action objects and female dancer)
 1961 – The Litterbug (opening and closing credits live-action environments)
 1965 – Pink Panzer
 1966 – Winnie the Pooh and the Honey Tree (opening and closing sequences)
 1968 – Winnie the Pooh and the Blustery Day (opening and closing sequences)

1970s
 1974 – Winnie the Pooh and Tigger Too (opening and closing sequences)
 1976 – Bugs and Daffy's Carnival of the Animals (animated characters in live action environments)

Features by decade

1920s
 1925 – The Lost World (Dinosaurs made by Willis O'Brien)

1930s
 1930 – King of Jazz (animated segment by Walter Lantz)
 1931 – Frankenstein (1931 film) (live-action) 
 1933 – Alice in Wonderland (animated segment "The Walrus and the Carpenter")
 1933 – King Kong (King Kong made by Willis O'Brien)
 1933 – Son of Kong (Little Kong made by Willis O'Brien)
 1933 – Zero for Conduct
 1934 – Babes in Toyland
 1934 – Hollywood Party (animated segment "The Hot Choc-Late Soldiers")
 1934 – Servants' Entrance (sequence with animated singing silverware)
 1935 – The New Gulliver
 1937 - Snow White and the Seven Dwarfs (Book only)
 1939 – The Golden Key 
 1939 – The Wizard of Oz (animation and live-action)

1940s
 1940 – Fantasia
 1941 – The Lady Eve
 1941 – The Reluctant Dragon
 1942 – Saludos Amigos
 1944 – The Three Caballeros
 1945 – Anchors Aweigh (Tom and Jerry make an appearance)
 1946 – Make Mine Music (David Lichine and Tatiana Riabouchinska in Two silhouttes)
 1946  – Holiday in Mexico
 1946 – Song of the South
 1946 – Ziegfeld Follies - deleted stop-motion sequence
 1947 – Fun and Fancy Free (story sequences)
 1948 – Melody Time (with Amigo Lady from Blame it on the Samba and Roy Rogers, Bobby Driscoll, and Luana Patten from Pecos Bill)
 1948 – Superman (Flying Sequences) 
 1948 – Two Guys from Texas
 1949 – Alice in Wonderland
 1949 – Mighty Joe Young (Joe Young made by Willis O'Brien and Ray Harryhausen)
 1949 – My Dream Is Yours
 1949 – So Dear to My Heart
 1949 – The Adventures of Ichabod and Mr. Toad (only library)

1950s
 1950 – Atom Man vs. Superman
 1950 – Cinderella (Book Only)
 1950 – Destination Moon
 1950 – The Great Rupert
 1953 – Dangerous When Wet
 1953 – Robot Monster
 1954 – Godzilla (stop-motion scene of Godzilla's tail destroying the Nichigeki Theater building)
 1956 – Forbidden Planet
 1956 – Invitation to the Dance (The third and final segment of Sinbad the Sailor)
 1957 – The Black Scorpion
 1957 – The Snow Queen (live action prologue with Art Linkletter)
 1958 – Tom Thumb 
 1958 – Vertigo (Dream Sequence)
 1959 – I Was a Satellite of the Sun
 1959 – Behemoth, the Sea Monster
 1959 – The Devil's Disciple 
 1959 - Sleeping Beauty (Book Only)
 1959 – Darby O'Gill and the Little People

1960s
 1960 – Dinosaurus!
 1960 – The 3 Worlds of Gulliver
 1961 – The Parent Trap (opening and closing credits sequence in stop-motion)
 1961 - Babes in Toyland (stop-motion soldiers)
 1962 – Jack the Giant Killer
 1962 – The Fabulous Baron Munchausen
 1962 – The Wonderful World of the Brothers Grimm
 1963 – Cici Can (animated ghost by Yalçın Çetin)
 1963 –  The Pink Panther
 1963 - It's a Mad, Mad, Mad, Mad World (opening credits sequence)
 1964 – Mary Poppins
 1964 – A Shot in the Dark
 1964 – Dogora (animated tentacle sequences)
 1964 – The Incredible Mr. Limpet
 1964 – Tale about the Lost Time
 1964 - The Misadventures of Merlin Jones (opening sequence)
 1964 – A Jester's Tale
 1966 – The Daydreamer (live action and stop motion sequences)
 1966 – The Stolen Airship
 1967 – Bedazzled (characters turn into animated flies)
 1968 – Yokai Monsters: One Hundred Monsters
 1968 – The Charge of the Light Brigade (opening sequence and linking sequences by Richard Williams)
 1968 – Madigan's Millions (animated collage opening credits sequence)
 1968 – Inspector Clouseau (Pink Panther sequences)
 1968 – Out of an Old Man's Head
 1969 – The Valley of Gwangi

1970s
 1970 – Song of Norway
 1970 – The Phantom Tollbooth
 1970 – The Nameless Knight
 1970 – Cry of the Banshee (animated opening credits sequence)
 1971 – On the Comet
 1971 – Bedknobs and Broomsticks (animated book, nightclub and soccer match).
 1971 – Godzilla vs. Hedorah (animated sequences)
 1971 – Willy Wonka & the Chocolate Factory
 1971 – And Now for Something Completely Different
 1971 – 200 Motels
 1972 – Godzilla vs. Gigan (manga sequences)
 1972 – The Enchanted World of Danny Kaye: The Emperor's New Clothes (live action with stop motion and animated sequences)
 1972 – The War Between Men and Women
 1972 – Daffy Duck and Porky Pig Meet the Groovie Goolies (TV) - (live action Mad Mirror Land sequence)
 1973 – Heavy Traffic
 1973 – Marco (live action and stop motion sequences)
 1974 – Down and Dirty Duck
 1974 – The Golden Voyage of Sinbad
 1974 – The Little Prince
 1974 – Dunderklumpen!
 1974 – Journey Back to Oz

 1975 – Coonskin
 1975 – Monty Python and the Holy Grail (animated sequences)
 1975 – Han's Christian Andersen's The Little Mermaid (live action sequences)
 1975 – The Return of the Pink Panther
 1975 – Bugs Bunny: Superstar (documentary with animated and live action footage)
 1976 – Allegro Non Troppo
 1976 – Futureworld (CGI animated hand from the 1972 film A Computer Animated Hand and CGI animated face from the 1974 film Faces & Body Parts)
 1976 – Eraserhead (one scene)
 1976 – I, Tintin
 1976 – The Pink Panther Strikes Again
 1977 – Pete's Dragon (Elliot the dragon animated character)
 1977 – Raggedy Ann & Andy: A Musical Adventure (Claire Williams sequences)
 1977 – Sinbad and the Eye of the Tiger
 1977 – Star Wars (stop-motion Holochess sequence created by Tippett Studio, and CGI animated Death Star attack plan briefing sequence from Jet Propulsion Laboratory made by Larry Cuba and Gary Imhoff)
 1977 – The Many Adventures of Winnie the Pooh (opening and closing sequences)
 1977 - Freaky Friday (opening sequences)
 1977 – Dot and the Kangaroo
 1977 – Gulliver's Travels
 1977 – Annie Hall
 1977 – Sender Nordlicht
 1978 – Hanna-Barbera's All-Star Comedy Ice Revue
 1978 – The Water Babies
 1978 – Laserblast
 1978 – Revenge of the Pink Panther
 1978 – Grease (animated opening sequence)
1978 – The Light Princess (backgrounds and most animals are animated)
 1978 – The Lord of the Rings
 1978 – Metamorphoses
 1978 – Star Wars Holiday Special (animated segment called "The Faithful Wookiee")
 1979 – Monty Python's Life of Brian (animated sequences)
 1979 – The Little Convict
 1979 – Baby Snakes
 1979 – The Black Hole (CGI animated opening sequence)
 1979 – Harpya

1980s
 1980 – The Great Rock & Roll Swindle (some segments)
 1980 – Xanadu (animated sequence by Don Bluth)
 1980 – 9 to 5 (one scene)
 1980 – Gamera: Super Monster (animated sequence)
 1980 – Popeye (opening animated sequence)
 1981 – American Pop
 1981 – Around the World with Dot
 1981 – The Great Muppet Caper (animated fly and birds)
 1981 – Maria, Mirabela
 1981 – The Evil Dead (stop motion scene)
 1982 – Creepshow (animated opening credits sequence and animated bridging sequences between anthology segments)
 1982 – Pink Floyd The Wall (animated sequences by Gerald Scarfe)
 1982 – Tron
 1982 – Trail of the Pink Panther
 1983 – Dot and the Bunny
 1983 – Twice Upon a Time (animated film with color live-action sequences)
 1983 – The Meaning of Life
 1983 – Twilight Zone: The Movie
 1983 – Winnie the Pooh and a Day for Eeyore (opening and closing sequences)
 1983 – What Have We Learned, Charlie Brown? (partially colorized World War II footage)
 1983 – Curse of the Pink Panther
 1984 - Ghostbusters
 1984 – The Camel Boy
 1984 – Cannonball Run II
 1984 – The Last Starfighter (footage from fictional Starfighter video game)
 1984 – Caravan of Courage: An Ewok Adventure (stop motion animation)
 1985 – Return to Oz (animated effects by Will Vinton)
 1985 – Os Trapalhões no Reino da Fantasia
 1985 – Better Off Dead (stop-motion burger scene)
 1985 – Pee-wee's Big Adventure
 1985 – Sesame Street Presents: Follow That Bird
 1985 – Ewoks: The Battle for Endor (stop motion animation)
 1986 – Dot and Keeto
 1986 – Dot and the Whale
 1986 – Aliens (go motion shots of Alien Queen)
 1986 – The Adventures of Milo and Otis
 1986 – Flight of the Navigator
 1986 – Ruthless People (animated opening sequence by Sally Cruikshank)
 1986 – One Crazy Summer (animated sequences)
 1986 – Howard the Duck (stop motion effects designed by Phil Tippett)
 1986 – The Kingdom Chums: Little David's Adventure
 1987 – Dot and the Smugglers
 1987 – Creepshow 2 (animated opening credits sequence and animated bridging sequences between anthology segments)
 1987 – Mannequin (Sally Cruikshank title animated sequence)
 1987 – Dot Goes to Hollywood
 1987 – The Gate
 1987 – Twilight of the Cockroaches
 1987 – Yogi Bear and the Magical Flight of the Spruce Goose (live-action footage of Spruce Goose flight shown during museum tour)
 1987 – Evil Dead 2 (stop motion scene)
 1987 – A Mouse, A Mystery and Me
 1988 – Treasure Island (Soviet film)
 1988 – Totally Minnie
 1988 – Beetlejuice (stop-motion effects)
 1988 – Alice
 1988 – It's the Girl in the Red Truck, Charlie Brown
 1988 – Katy, Kiki y Koko (a.k.a. Katy Meets the Aliens or Katy and the Katerpillar Kids - aliens watch live action footage from Earth)
 1988 – Moonwalker (Will Vinton "Speed Demon" segment)
 1988 – Mickey's 60th Birthday (TV special)
 1988 – Who Framed Roger Rabbit
 1988 - Big Top Pee-wee
 1989 – Going Overboard (animated sequences)
 1989 – Raja Chinna Roja
 1989 – A Nightmare on Elm Street 5: The Dream Child ('Super Freddy' animated comic book sequence)
 1989 – Godzilla vs. Biollante (stop motion and animated sequences) (deleted scenes)
 1989 - National Lampoon's Christmas Vacation (opening credits)
 1989 - The Wizard (footage from video games)
 1989 - Ghostbusters II
 1989 - Bill & Ted's Excellent Adventure

1990s
 1990 - Teenage Mutant Ninja Turtles (1990 film)
 1990 – Army of Darkness (stop motion skeletons)
 1990 – Gremlins 2: The New Batch (electric gremlin, stop motion, and Chuck Jones animated opening and ending sequences)
 1990 – Deepa & Rupa: A Fairy Tale from India
 1990 – Grim Prairie Tales (dream sequence)
 1990 – Madhouse (Sally Cruikshank title animated sequence)
 1990 – Rockin' Through the Decades
 1990 – Werner – Beinhart!
 1990 – The Gate II: Trespassers
 1991 - Teenage Mutant Ninja Turtles II: The Secret of the Ooze
 1991 - Bill & Ted's Bogus Journey
 1991 - The Addams Family (1991 film)
 1991 – To Want to Fly
 1991 – Problem Child 2 (Cartoon rabies scene)
 1991 – Rock-A-Doodle
 1991 – Nilus the Sandman: The Boy Who Dreamed Christmas
 1991 – Volere volare
 1991 – City Slickers (Wayne Fitzgerald & Bob Kurtz animated title sequence)
 1991 – Freddy's Dead: The Final Nightmare (sequence set inside a video game)
 1992 – Cool World
 1992 – Evil Toons
 1992 – Stay Tuned (Chuck Jones sequence)
 1992 – The Lawnmower Man (animated sequences)
 1992 – Braindead (one scene)
 1992 – Invasion of the Bunny Snatchers (one shot of a live action mouth on Daffy Duck's bill)
 1992 – Blinky Bill: The Mischievous Koala
 1993 - Teenage Mutant Ninja Turtles III
 1993 - Addams Family Values
 1993 – O' Faby
 1993 – Kamen Rider ZO 
 1993 – Son of the Pink Panther
 1993 – Last Action Hero (one animated character)
 1993 – Super Mario Bros. (animated dinosaurs shown in opening sequence)
 1993 – Jurassic Park (John Hammond shown with "Mr. DNA", an animated DNA strand, as part of a projector presentation at the park's visitor center)
 1993 – Opéra imaginaire
 1993 – RoboCop 3
 1993 – Mrs. Doubtfire
 1993 - Hocus Pocus (1993 film)
 1994 – 
 1994 – Dot in Space
 1994 – Natural Born Killers
 1994 – Taxandria
 1994 – Faust
 1994 – The Flintstones
 1994 – City Slickers II: The Legend of Curly's Gold (animated title sequence)
 1994 – The Mask
 1994 – The Pagemaster
 1994 – In Search of Dr. Seuss
 1995 - Jumanji
 1995 – Circle of Life: An Environmental Fable
 1995 – Babe
 1995 – Balto (live action sequences)
 1995 – Casper
 1995 – Tank Girl (animated sequences)
 1995 – Mortal Kombat
 1995 – Mighty Morphin Power Rangers: The Movie (CGI Zords)
 1995 – Four Rooms
 1996 – Conspirators of Pleasure
 1996 – Joe's Apartment
 1996 – A Very Brady Sequel
 1996 – The Adventures of Pinocchio
 1996 – Mars Attacks!
 1996 – The Stupids
 1996 – James and the Giant Peach
 1996 – Space Jam
 1996 – 101 Dalmatians (TV).
 1996 – Sabrina the Teenage Witch
 1996 – Tank Girl (one scene)
 1997 – Casper: A Spirited Beginning
 1997 – George of the Jungle (animated opening)
 1997 – An American Werewolf in Paris (CGI werewolves)
 1997 – The End of Evangelion
 1997 - The Lost World: Jurassic Park
 1997 – For the Bible Tells Me So
 1997 – Hercules
 1997 – The Beautician and the Beast
 1997 – Titanic (computer animated graphic recreating the sinking of the Titanic shown by Lewis Bodine to an elderly Rose Dawson Calvert)
 1997 – Mr. Magoo (opening and closing sequences)
 1998 - Addams Family Reunion
 1998 – Babe: Pig in the City
 1998 – Casper Meets Wendy
 1998 – Lost in Space
 1998 – Run Lola Run
 1998 – Small Soldiers
 1998 – Sabrina Goes to Rome
 1999 – My Favorite Martian
 1999 – South Park: Bigger, Longer & Uncut (character with live action face and live action posters seen in background)
 1999 – Belle's Tales of Friendship
 1999 – Inspector Gadget
 1999 – Sabrina Down Under (CGI fish sequence)
 1999 – Animal Farm
 1999 – Fantasia 2000
 1999 – Stuart Little

2000s
 2000 – The Tigger Movie
 2000 – The 10th Kingdom (animated butterflies and hearts, and the singing ring, in the Kissing Town sequence and the coronation banquet scene)
 2000 – The Flintstones in Viva Rock Vegas
 2000 – Dinosaur
 2000 – The Adventures of Rocky and Bullwinkle
 2000 – Thomas and the Magic Railroad
 2000 – Little Otik
 2000 – How the Grinch Stole Christmas
 2000 – 102 Dalmatians
 2001 - Evolution (2001 film)
 2001 - Harry Potter and the Philosopher's Stone (film)
 2001 - Jurassic Park III
 2001 – Osmosis Jones
 2001 – Monkeybone
 2001 – Amélie (computer animated elements, including imaginary crocodile and pig lamp)
 2001 – Hedwig and the Angry Inch (The Origin of Love sequence)
 2001 – Big Shot's Funeral
 2001 – Freddy Got Fingered (Zebras in America sequence)
 2001 – Cats & Dogs
 2001 – Rat Race
 2001 – Christmas Carol: The Movie
 2001 - Harry Potter and the Chamber of Secrets (film)
 2002 – El Rey de la Granja (The King Farm)
 2002 – Kung Pow! Enter the Fist (Lion King parody sequence)
 2002 – The Dangerous Lives of Altar Boys
 2002 – Bowling for Columbine (animated sequence explaining the history of the United States)
 2002 – Resident Evil (CGI sequence showing map of underground facility known as the Hive)
 2002 – Scooby-Doo
 2002 – Lilo & Stitch (clip of Earth vs. the Spider)
 2002 – Stuart Little 2
 2002 – Frida
 2002 - The Wild Thornberrys Movie (live action animals in the credits)
 2003 – Kangaroo Jack
 2003 – The Lizzie McGuire Movie
 2003 – Elf (stop-motion characters)
 2003 – Y Mabinogi (the majority of the film was animated, although the opening and closing acts were live action)
 2003 – Looney Tunes: Back in Action
 2003 – George of the Jungle 2 (opening sequence)
 2003 – Inspector Gadget 2
 2003 – Spy Kids 3-D: Game Over
 2003 – The Cat in the Hat
 2003 – Kill Bill: Volume 1 (one scene)
 2004 - Kill Bill: Volume 2
 2004 – Save Virgil
 2004 – Scooby-Doo 2: Monsters Unleashed
 2004 – The Punisher (animated opening scene set in Kuwait included in the extended cut)
 2004 – Super Size Me (animated sequence explaining how chicken nuggets are made)
 2004 – Harry Potter and the Prisoner of Azkaban (end credits sequence animated in the style of the Marauder's Map)
 2004 – Back to Gaya (also known as Boo, Zino & the Snurks)
 2004 – Garfield: The Movie
 2004 – Immortal (animated sequences)
 2004 – Anchorman: The Legend of Ron Burgundy (animated sequence)
 2004 – The SpongeBob SquarePants Movie
 2004 – Fat Albert
 2004 – Cine Gibi: O Filme
 2004 – The Life Aquatic with Steve Zissou
 2004 – Lemony Snicket's A Series of Unfortunate Events
 2004 – Winnie the Pooh: Springtime with Roo
 2004 – The Lion King 1½ (live action commercial on theater screen when Pumbaa sits on remote)
 2004 – Five Children and It (film)
 2004 – The World
 2004 – The Polar Express
 2004 - Ella Enchanted (film)
 2005 - Harry Potter and the Goblet of Fire (film)
 2005 - Son of the Mask
 2005 - Zathura: A Space Adventure
 2005 – Herbie: Fully Loaded
 2005 – Lunacy
 2005 – King Kong
 2005 – Kiss Kiss Bang Bang (animated opening credits sequence)
 2005 – The Piano Tuner of Earthquakes
 2005 – Tom-Yum-Goong (animated dream sequence)
 2005 – Lilo & Stitch 2: Stitch Has a Glitch (clips from Them!)
 2005 – Reefer Madness  ("The Brownie Song" sequence)
 2005 – Fuck (documentary with animated scenes by Bill Plympton)
 2006 – McDull, the Alumni
 2006 – Hoodwinked!
 2006 – The Sparky Book
 2006 – Inside Man (sequence depicting footage from fictional Gangstas iz Genocide video game)
 2006 – Stay Alive (video game sequences)
 2006 – Hui Buh
 2006 – Garfield: A Tail of Two Kitties
 2006 – Hood of Horror
 2006 – The Science of Sleep
 2006 – The Sparky Book
 2006 – How to Eat Fried Worms (animated sequences)
 2006 – The Fall (one animated sequence)
 2006 – Happy Feet (live action sequences)
 2006 – The Pink Panther (animated opening sequence)
 2006 – Princess (animated film with live action scenes)
 2006 – Miss Potter
 2006 – Re-Animated
 2006 – Arthur and the Invisibles
 2006 – Night at the Museum
 2007 - Harry Potter and the Order of the Phoenix (film)
 2007 - Mr. Magorium's Wonder Emporium
 2007 – Juno (stop motion animated opening credits sequence)
 2007 – Chicago 10 (animated documentary)
 2007 – Hot Fuzz - (animated notebook sequence)
 2007 – Are We Done Yet? (animated intro)
 2007 – Enchanted
 2007 – For the Bible Tells Me So (one animated sequence)
 2007 – Resiklo 
 2007 – Eagle vs Shark (animated interludes)
 2007 – Keda Reda
 2007 – Alvin and the Chipmunks 
 2008 – AROG (animated prehistoric animals)
 2008 – WALL-E
 2008 – The Spiderwick Chronicles (film)
 2008 – Waltz with Bashir (one live-action sequence)
 2008 – Sathyam
 2008 – Fly Me to the Moon (live-action ending sequence)
 2008 – Semum (animated demonic creatures)
 2008 – Hellboy II: The Golden Army (stop motion puppet prologue sequence)
 2009 – 500 Days of Summer
 2009 – Arthur and the Revenge of Maltazard
 2009 – The Private Lives of Pippa Lee (one scene)
 2009 – Watchmen (The Ultimate Cut includes the animated short film Tales of the Black Freighter edited in throughout.)
 2009 – G-Force
 2009 – Night at the Museum: Battle of the Smithsonian
 2009 – SpongeBob's Truth or Square
 2009 – Cabin Fever 2: Spring Fever (animated sequences)
 2009 – Shorts: The Adventures of the Wishing Rock
 2009 – The Pink Panther 2 (animated opening sequence, closing scene with animated character in live action environment)
 2009 – Alvin and the Chipmunks: The Squeakquel
 2009 - Velveteen Rabbit
 2009 – Kick
 2009 – Avatar
 2009 - Scooby-Doo! The Mystery Begins
 2009 - Aliens in the Attic
 2009 - Harry Potter and the Half-Blood Prince (film)

2010s
 2010 - Harry Potter and the Deathly Hallows – Part 1
 2010 - Gulliver's Travels (2010 film)
 2010 - Scooby-Doo! Curse of the Lake Monster
 2010 – Gainsbourg: A Heroic Life
 2010 – Howl (animated sequences)
 2010 – Alice in Wonderland
 2010 – Diary of a Wimpy Kid (animated sequences)
 2010 – Pixels 
 2010 – Furry Vengeance (animated opening sequence)
 2010 – Never Sleep Again: The Elm Street Legacy (claymation opening credits sequence)
 2010 – Cats & Dogs: The Revenge of Kitty Galore
 2010 – Surviving Life
 2010 – Bunraku
 2010 – Higglety Pigglety Pop! or There Must Be More to Life (live action puppetry and stop-motion)
 2010 – Ultramarines: The Movie
 2010 – Shank
 2010 – Ramona and Beezus
 2010 – Thillalangadi
 2010 – Scott Pilgrim vs. the World
 2010 – Harry Potter and the Deathly Hallows – Part 1 (The Tale of the Three Brothers sequence)
 2010 – Marmaduke
 2010 – Kick Ass (animated comic book flashback sequence)
 2010 – Yogi Bear
 2010 – Jonah Hex (animated backstory sequence)
 2010 – Don't Go (live-action/animated short by Turgut Akaçık)
 2010 – Super
 2010 – Jackass 3D (animated opening scene featuring Beavis and Butt-Head)
 2010 – Arthur 3: The War of the Two Worlds
 2010 – Tron: Legacy
 2011 - Harry Potter and the Deathly Hallows – Part 2
 2011 – Brasil Animado
 2011 – Rango
 2011 – Diary of a Wimpy Kid: Rodrick Rules (animated sequences)
 2011 - Hawaiian Vacation
 2011 – Hop
 2011 – Death of a Superhero
 2011 – A Fairly Odd Movie: Grow Up, Timmy Turner!
 2011 – Winnie the Pooh
 2011 – Priest (animated prologue sequence)
 2011 – The Smurfs
 2011 – Rascals
 2011 – Happy Feet Two (live action sequences)
 2011 - Judy Moody and the Not Bummer Summer  (animated sequences)
 2011 - Captain America: The First Avenger (animated end credit sequence depicting World War Two)
 2011 - A Very Harold & Kumar 3D Christmas  (claymation sequence)
 2011 - Alvin and the Chipmunks: Chipwrecked
 2012 – An Oversimplification of Her Beauty 
 2012 – 
 2012 – Eega (live action animation of the fly protagonist)
 2012 – Ted
 2012 – A Fairly Odd Christmas
 2012 – Sur la Piste du Marsupilami
 2012 – Diary of a Wimpy Kid: Dog Days (animated sequences)
 2012 – Halo 4: Forward Unto Dawn
 2012 – Gambit (animated opening credits sequence)
 2012 – Soledad y Larguirucho (2012)
 2013 – Movie 43 (animated cat)
 2013 – Naiyaandi
 2013 – Robosapien: Rebooted
 2013 – The Congress
 2013 – The Smurfs 2
 2013 – Percy Jackson: Sea of Monsters (stained glass animated sequence created by Embassy VFX depicting the backstory of Kronos)
 2013 – Fright Night 2: New Blood (animated motion comic sequence explaing the backstory of Elizabeth Báthory)
 2013 – Shimajirō to Fufu no Daibōken: Sukue! Nanairo no Hana
 2013 – Ender's Game (video game sequences)
 2013 – Walking with Dinosaurs
 2013 – Das Kleine Gespenst
 2013 – Minuscule: Valley of the Lost Ants
 2014 – Gekijōban Cardfight!! Vanguard
 2014 – The Lego Movie
 2014 – Maleficent
 2014 – Balls Out 
 2014 – Earth to Echo 
 2014 – Bobby Jasoos
 2014 – Kick
 2014 – Hercules
 2014 – İksir (animated animal characters)
 2014 – A Fairly Odd Summer
 2014 – Vaayai Moodi Pesavum
 2014 – Garm Wars: The Last Druid
 2014 – Paddington (CGI main protagonist)
 2014 – Shimajiro to Kujira no Uta
 2014 – Seth's Dominion
 2014 – Night at the Museum: Secret of the Tomb
 2014 – Bill, the Galactic Hero
 2014 - Teenage Mutant Ninja Turtles (2014 film)
 2015 - Jurassic World
 2015 – Madea's Tough Love (live action opening and closing scenes)
 2015 – Me and Earl and the Dying Girl
 2015 – Absolutely Anything
 2015 –  (animated gopher characters)
 2015 - Pixels (ending sequence in 2002 and various video game characters in CGI 3d)
 2015 – Shimajirō to Ōkina Ki
 2015 – The Diary of a Teenage Girl (animated sequences)
 2015 – The SpongeBob Movie: Sponge Out of Water
 2015 – Cinderella
 2015 – O Kadhal Kanmani
 2015 – Ghosthunters: On Icy Trails
 2015 – We Are Your Friends
 2015 – American Ultra (animated "Apollo Ape" comic book sequences)
 2015 - Ted 2
 2015 - Goosebumps
 2015 – Krampus (computer-animated sequence)
 2015 – Kurt Cobain: Montage of Heck (documentary with animated scenes)
 2015 – Monster Hunt
 2015 – The Weirdo Hero (animated form of protagonist's self-doubt)
 2015 – Zoom
 2015 - Star Wars: The Force Awakens (stop-motion Holochess sequence created by Tippett Studio)
 2015 – Alvin and the Chipmunks: The Road Chip
 2016 - Fantastic Beasts and Where to Find Them (film)
 2016 -  Teenage Mutant Ninja Turtles: Out of the Shadows
 2016 - Ghostbusters (2016 film)
 2016 - Pee-wee's Big Holiday
 2016 – Reveries of a Solitary Walker
 2016 – Deadpool (character sees animated hallucinations after being stabbed in the head)
 2016 – Shimajirō to Kuni Ehon
 2016 – Tower (animated rotoscoped documentary with some unaltered live action footage)
 2016 – Captain America: The Winter Soldier (animated end credits sequence)
 2016 – Sausage Party (live action footage of actors shown during final scene)
 2016 – Alice Through the Looking Glass
 2016 – Teenage Mutant Ninja Turtles: Out of the Shadows
 2016 – The Legend of Tarzan
 2016 – The BFG (CGI giants with motion-capture)
 2016 – Ghostbusters (villain briefly turns into hand-drawn animated Ghostbusters logo; there are also CGI ghosts)
 2016 – Nine Lives
 2016 – Pete's Dragon (CGI dragon)
 2016 – Middle School: The Worst Years of My Life (animated sequences)
 2016 – Shin Godzilla
 2016 - The Jungle Book (CGI animated animals)
 2016 – Yo-kai Watch: Soratobu Kujira to Double no Sekai no Daibōken da Nyan!
 2016 – Saving Sally (main protagonists interacting with animated characters)
 2016 – Upin & Ipin: Jeng Jeng Jeng!
 2017 - Jumanji: Welcome to the Jungle
 2016 – A Monster Calls (animated sequences)
 2016 – Life, Animated  (documentary with animated and live action footage)
 2017 – Bunyan and Babe
 2017 – Dave Made a Maze (traditionally animated animated opening credits sequence and later scene where the characters are turned into cardboard puppets)
 2017 – Hallucination Short Film
 2017 – Monster Trucks (CG animated monsters)
 2017 - Beauty and the Beast
 2017 – Ok Jaanu
 2017 – The Lego Batman Movie (footage from Jerry Maguire)
 2017 – Captain Underpants: The First Epic Movie (puppetry sequence)
 2017 – Monkey Business: The Adventures of Curious George's Creators (documentary with animated scenes, documentary of Curious George)
 2017 – Okja
 2017 – Diary of a Wimpy Kid: The Long Haul (animated sequences)
 2017 – Spider-Man: Homecoming (animated pencil-drawn end credits sequence)
 2017 – The Lego Ninjago Movie
 2017 – Foxtrot (animated sequence)
 2017 – Keeping Justice (animated sequence)
 2017 – Woody Woodpecker (CGI-animated title character)
 2017 – Paddington 2 (CGI main protagonist)
 2017 – Jumanji: Welcome to the Jungle (animated end credits sequence depicting a moving map of the land of Jumanji)
 2017 – The Pirates of Somalia (animated sequences)
 2018 - Fantastic Beasts: The Crimes of Grindelwald
 2018 - Jurassic World: Fallen Kingdom
 2018 - Daphne & Velma
 2018 – Monster Hunt 2
 2018 – Mandy
 2018 – We the Animals (film) (animated sequences)
 2018 – Peter Rabbit
 2018 – A Wrinkle in Time
 2018 – The Hurricane Heist
 2018 – Ready Player One
 2018 – Show Dogs
 2018 – Christopher Robin
 2018 – Poor Greg Drowning (animated sequences between the live action scenes)
 2018 – Freaky Friday (animation faces at the beginning)
 2018 – Goosebumps 2: Haunted Halloween
 2018 – The Nutcracker and the Four Realms
 2018 – Mowgli: Legend of the Jungle
 2018 – Mary Poppins Returns
 2018 – Welcome to Marwen
 2018 – The Samuel Project
 2018 – Far From Home (short film)
 2019 - Jumanji: The Next Level
 2019 – Alita: Battle Angel (protagonist portrayed using motion-capture)
 2019 – The Lego Movie 2: The Second Part
 2019 – Pokémon Detective Pikachu
 2019  –Dumbo
 2019 – Devi 2
 2019  –Aladdin 
 2019 – Shazam! (animated sketches during end credits)
 2019 – Booksmart (stop-motion animation sequences)
 2019 – Spider-Man: Far From Home (stop motion end credits sequence created by Perception)
 2019 – Dora and the Lost City of Gold (includes brief hand drawn animation)
 2019 – Playmobil: The Movie
 2019 – SpongeBob's Big Birthday Blowout
 2019 – The Lion King (only one live action shot, no interaction)
 2019 – Maleficent: Mistress of Evil
 2019 – Mindanao
 2019 – Lady and the Tramp
 2019 - The Banana Splits Movie
 2019 - Kim Possible (film)

2020s
 2020 - Cats & Dogs 3: Paws Unite!
 2020 - The Witches (2020 film)
 2020 - Bill & Ted Face the Music
 2020 – Love and Monsters
 2020 – Earth Short Film
 2020 – Dolittle (animated opening sequence)
 2020 – Birds of Prey (animated opening sequence)
 2020 – Sonic the Hedgehog (fully CGI animated opening sequence and CGI main protagonist)
 2020 – The Call of the Wild
 2020 – The SpongeBob Movie: Sponge on the Run
 2020 – The One and Only Ivan
 2020 - Phineas and Ferb the Movie: Candace Against the Universe (brief live-action segment)
 2020 – Mulan
2020 – Shadow in the Cloud (animated opening sequence and animated CGI demon)
 2020 – I'm Thinking of Ending Things
 2020 - Jiu Jitsu (animated comic panel sequences)
 2020 - Magikland
 2020 – Coolie No. 1
 2021 - A Loud House Christmas
 2021 - Ghostbusters: Afterlife
 2021 – Tom and Jerry
 2021 – Teddy
 2021 – Cruella
 2021 - The Mitchells vs. the Machines (animated film with live-action puppetry, footage, and imagery)
 2021 – Peter Rabbit 2: The Runaway
 2021 – Space Jam: A New Legacy
 2021 – The Suicide Squad (animated flowers and birds seen during action sequence involving Harley Quinn)
 2021 – Candyman (puppetry animation sequences)
 2021 - Marcel the Shell with Shoes On
 2021 – Venom: Let There Be Carnage (animated storybook sequence created by Framestore, depicting the backstory of Cletus Kasady)
2021 – Happier Than Ever: A Love Letter to Los Angeles
2021 – Clifford the Big Red Dog
 2021 – Ghostbusters: Afterlife

 2021 – Spider-Man: No Way Home (animated end credits sequence created by Imaginary Forces)
 2022 - Blue's Big City Adventure
2022 - Chip 'n Dale: Rescue Rangers
2022 - Karthikeya 2 (film's premise is show in animation)
2022 - Disenchanted
2022 - Jurassic World Dominion
2022 - Hocus Pocus 2
2022 - Lyle, Lyle, Crocodile
2022 - Pinocchio
2022 - Sonic the Hedgehog 2
2022 - The Guardians of the Galaxy Holiday Special (rotoscoped animation sequences)
2022 - Avatar: The Way of Water
2022 - The Mean One
2022 - Fantastic Beasts: The Secrets of Dumbledore
2023 - Winnie-the-Pooh: Blood and Honey
2023 - Shazam! Fury of the Gods (animated storybook end credits sequence)
 2023 – Ayalaan
2023 - Peter Pan & Wendy
2023 - The Little Mermaid (2023 film)
2023 - Strays
2023 - Harold and the Purple Crayon
2023 - Coyote vs. Acme
2023 - Saving Bikini Bottom 
2024 - Snow White
2024 - Thomas & Friends: The Movie 
2024 - Mufasa: The Lion King (only one live action shot, no interaction)
2024 - Sonic the Hedgehog 3
2024 - Avatar: The Seed Brearer
2025 - How to Train Your Dragon
2025 - Untitled fourth SpongeBob film
2026 - Avatar 4
2028 - Avatar 5

TBA 
 TBA - The Aristocats
 TBA - Bambi
 TBA - Cat and Dog
 TBA - Clifford the Big Red Dog 2
TBA - Finding Audrey
TBA - The Garden
TBA - Hercules
 TBA - The Hunchback of Notre Dame
 TBA - Jak and Daxter
 TBA - James and the Giant Peach
TBA - The Jungle Book 2 (CGI animals)
TBA - Lilo & Stitch
TBA - No Flying in the House
 TBA - Paddington in Peru
TBA - Paper Lanterns
TBA - Peter Rabbit 3
 TBA - The Pink Panther
 TBA - Puff, the Magic Dragon
 TBA - Rabbids
TBA - Robin Hood
TBA - Untitled third Space Jam film
 TBA - Talking Tom & Friends
 TBA - The Secret of NIMH
 TBA - The Sword in the Stone 
 TBA - Wed Wabbit
 TBA - Winter Wonderland

See also
 :Category: Television series with live action and animation
 List of highest grossing live-action/animated films

References

External links
 A Mixed Picture – drawn animation/live action hybrids worldwide from the 1960s to the 1980s (by F.S. Litten)

 
Lists of films